The Carroll County Courthouse is a historic courthouse located at 101 W. Main St. in Delphi, Carroll County, Indiana.  It was designed by architect Elmer E. Dunlap and built in 1916.  It is a three-story Classical Revival style rectangular building of Indiana limestone. It features a three-story projecting pavilion. The Carroll County Courthouse property has two prominent works of public art in its collection: the Murphy Memorial Drinking Fountain (1918) and the Soldiers and Sailors Monument (1888); they are considered contributing objects along with a World War II artillery gun.

It was listed on the National Register of Historic Places in 2003.  It is located in the Delphi Courthouse Square Historic District.

Gallery

References

County courthouses in Indiana
Courthouses on the National Register of Historic Places in Indiana
Neoclassical architecture in Indiana
Government buildings completed in 1916
Buildings and structures in Carroll County, Indiana
National Register of Historic Places in Carroll County, Indiana
Tourist attractions in Carroll County, Indiana
1916 establishments in Indiana
Historic district contributing properties in Indiana
Delphi, Indiana